"You Haven't Done Nothin" is a 1974 funk single by Stevie Wonder, taken from his album Fulfillingness' First Finale and featuring background vocals by The Jackson 5. The politically aware song became Wonder's fourth Number 1 pop hit and his tenth Number 1 soul hit. It also reached Number 1 in Canada. In the UK the single spent five weeks on the chart, peaking at Number 30.

The song was one of his angriest political statements and was aimed squarely at President Richard Nixon, who resigned two days after the record's release. The Jackson Five sing the words "Doo da wop!" repeatedly in the chorus, when Wonder sings "Jackson 5, join along with me, say". The song also features a thick clavinet track and an early appearance of the drum machine. The B-side "Big Brother", also a political statement, was taken from Wonder's 1972 album Talking Book.

Billboard described "You Haven't Done Nothin'" as being "exceptionally powerful" and more subtle than most protest songs, particularly praising the synthesiser arrangement and the vocal performance.  Cash Box called it a "super track filled with the memories of the great 'Superstition' a while back" and said that "musically, horns, keyboards, bass and guitar highlight and vocally, aside from Stevie's magic, the Jackson 5 is right in there on 'doo wops.'" Record World called it "a message song to end them all" in which Wonder "deals directly with those who'd only promise their way to a better world."

Personnel
 Stevie Wonder – lead vocal, Hohner clavinet, hi-hats, crash cymbal, keyboard horns, drum programming
 Reggie McBride – electric bass 
 The Jackson 5 – background vocals

Covers
 Roger Daltrey covered the song on his 2018 album As Long as I Have You.

References

1974 singles
Stevie Wonder songs
Billboard Hot 100 number-one singles
Cashbox number-one singles
Political songs
Protest songs
Songs written by Stevie Wonder
Motown singles
1974 songs
Tamla Records singles
Songs about Richard Nixon
RPM Top Singles number-one singles
Song recordings produced by Stevie Wonder